Akinori (written: 聡徳, 昭徳, 昭典, 明徳, 明憲. 明訓, 明紀, 暉記, 晃教, 晶則 or 彰規) is a masculine Japanese given name. Notable people with the name include:

, Mongolian sumo wrestler
, Japanese politician
, Japanese footballer
, Japanese baseball player
, Japanese footballer
, Japanese footballer
, Japanese singer-songwriter and actor
, Japanese automobile designer
, Japanese gymnast
, Japanese footballer
, Japanese electrophysiologist
, Japanese stock car racing driver
, Japanese baseball player
, Japanese computer scientist

Fictional characters 

 Akinori Konoha (木葉秋紀), a character from the manga and anime Haikyu!! with the position of  wing spiker from Fukurōdani Academy.

Japanese masculine given names